Patrick Huth (born 25 July 1995) is a German footballer who plays as a midfielder for TSG Pfeddersheim.

References

1995 births
Living people
German footballers
Association football midfielders
1. FSV Mainz 05 II players
3. Liga players
Regionalliga players
Oberliga (football) players